Penn-Craft Historic District is a national historic district located at Luzerne Township, Fayette County, Pennsylvania.  The district includes 108 contributing buildings, 7 contributing sites, and 6 contributing structures in the subsistence homestead community of Penn-Craft. The planned community was first built between 1937 and 1943 by the American Friends Service Committee, as a community for unemployed miners.  In addition to two pre-Penn Craft dwellings, contributing buildings include remaining frame "temporary" houses, 50 stone houses, knitting factory (1939), cooperative store (1942), and a frame barn.

It was added to the National Register of Historic Places in 1989.

When the June 2012 Mid-Atlantic and Midwest derecho passed through southwestern Pennsylvania on June 29, 2012, the community's store was destroyed by a fire resulting from a lightning strike.

References

External links
Town of Penn-Craft, Penncraft, Fayette County, PA: 18 photos, 24 data pages, and 1 photo caption page at Historic American Buildings Survey
Subsistence-Homestead Towns, Penncraft, Fayette County, PA: 26 data pages at Historic American Buildings Survey

Historic American Buildings Survey in Pennsylvania
Historic districts on the National Register of Historic Places in Pennsylvania
Historic districts in Fayette County, Pennsylvania
New Deal subsistence homestead communities
National Register of Historic Places in Fayette County, Pennsylvania